The Museo Goya - Colección Ibercaja - Museo Camón Aznar is a fine arts museum in Zaragoza, Spain. It opened in 1979 under the name Museo Camón Aznar, after the art collector from the city who had contributed the nucleus of its collection.

The museum collection includes over 1,000 works, with around 500 on display. It was given its current name on the 26th of February 2015 after the addition of the Ibercaja collection and the works held by the Real Sociedad Económica Aragonesa de Amigos del País.

References

See also
Goya Museum, an art museum in Castres, France

Art museums and galleries in Spain
Tourist attractions in Zaragoza
Museums in Zaragoza
Art museums established in 1979
1979 establishments in Spain